The 1955 Pau Grand Prix was a non-championship Formula One motor race held on 11 April 1955 at the Pau circuit, in Pau, Pyrénées-Atlantiques, France. The Grand Prix was won by Jean Behra, driving the Maserati 250F. Eugenio Castellotti finished second and Roberto Mieres third.

1955 proved to be a crucial year for the Pau Grand Prix. Mario Alborghetti was killed in an accident on lap 19 of the Grand Prix. With the 1955 Le Mans disaster, worldwide ramifications led to the 1956 event not being run.

Classification

Race

References

Pau Grand Prix
Pau
1955 in French motorsport